Atlantic Coast Line Railroad Depot or Atlantic Coast Line Depot may refer to:

Atlantic Coast Line Depot, a list of stations on the Atlantic Coast Line Railroad

Individual stations

 Dade City Atlantic Coast Line Railroad Depot, Dade City, FL, listed on the NRHP in Florida
 Old Dundee Atlantic Coast Line Railroad Depot, Dundee, FL
 Old Lake Placid Atlantic Coast Line Railroad Depot, Lake Placid, FL
 Atlantic Coast Line Railroad Depot (Lake Wales, Florida), listed on the NRHP in Florida
 Union Depot and Atlantic Coast Line Freight Station, Live Oak, FL, listed on the NRHP in Florida
 Old Mount Dora Atlantic Coast Line Railroad Station, Mount Dora, FL
 Punta Gorda Atlantic Coast Line Depot, Punta Gorda, FL, listed on the NRHP in Florida
 Atlantic Coast Line Passenger Depot (Sarasota, Florida), listed on the NRHP in Florida
 Atlantic Coast Line Railroad Station (Fayetteville, North Carolina), listed on the NRHP in North Carolina
 Atlantic Coast Line Railroad Depot (Conway, South Carolina), listed on the NRHP in South Carolina
 Atlantic Coast Line Depot (Florence, South Carolina), now called Florence station
 Myrtle Beach Atlantic Coast Line Railroad Station, Myrtle Beach, SC, listed on the NRHP in South Carolina

See also
Atlantic Coast Line Railroad, U.S. Class I railroad from 1900 until 1967